Aisha Lawal Oladunni  is a Nigerian actor, scriptwriter and filmmaker. She was nominated for Most Promising Actress of the Year (Yoruba) award at the 2014 City People Entertainment Awards, Best Actress in Leading Role (Yoruba) award at the 2015 Best of Nollywood Awards, Best Indigenous Language Movie/TV Series (Yoruba) at the 2016 Africa Magic Viewers' Choice Awards and Best Actress of the Year (Yoruba) and Best Supporting Actress of the Year (Yoruba) at 2018 City People Movie Awards.

Early life
Aisha Lawal is a native of Ibadan, Oyo State, Nigeria and attended Adeen International School and Federal Government College, Ogbomoso. Aisha Lawal had a passion for acting ever since she was young, where she would act in different stage plays. Lawal later attended the Lead City University, where she obtained a degree in law and a second degree in public administration.

Career 
Aisha Lawal attended Femi Adebayo's J15 School of Performing Arts from 2008 to 2010 and learnt how to act. Her first film is Adunmadeke where she played the role of a prostitute. She rose to fame from her role in Irugbin. Since her rise to fame, she proceeded to act in over 100 movies. She has produced up to ten films such as Imu Nika and Opon Ife.

She recently starred in Love Castle (2021) and Kunle Afolayan Netflix movie Aníkúlápó (2022) as Olori Sunkanmi.

Personal life 
Aisha Lawal is from a family of three children and she is the second child. She is married with a daughter. She is a practicing Muslim.

Filmography 

 King of Thieves (2022)
 Aníkúlápó (2022)
 Love Castle (2021)
 Survival of Jelili (2019)
 Blogger's Wife (2017)
 Simbi Alamala
 Eregun
 Jalaruru
 Aiyepegba
 Apala
 Iyawo Kan
 Okirika
 Dilemma
 Shadow
 Nkan Inu Igi
 Irugbin
 Adunmadeke

References

External links 

Living people
Actresses from Oyo State
Yoruba actresses
Nigerian actresses
Year of birth missing (living people)